Gumplowicz may refer to: 

 Ludwig Gumplowicz (1838–1909) — Polish sociologist, jurist, historian, and political scientist.
 Philippe Gumplowicz (b. 1950) — French musicologist and music historian.